Gowd Kahluyeh (also Romanized as Gowd Kahlūyeh; also known as Gowd Kahleh) is a village in Par Zeytun Rural District, Meymand District, Firuzabad County, Fars Province, Iran. At the 2006 census, its population was 105, in 23 families.

References 

Populated places in Firuzabad County